James Protus Pigott (September 11, 1852 – July 1, 1919) was a U.S. Representative from Connecticut.

Born in New Haven, Connecticut, Pigott attended the common schools and graduated from Yale College in 1878, where he served on the fifth editorial board of The Yale Record in his junior year. cIn his senior year, Pigott was a founding editor of the Yale Daily News.

After graduating from Yale Law School in 1880, he was admitted to the bar in the same year and commenced the practice of law in New Haven. He served as New Haven city clerk from 1881 to 1884.

Pigott served as member of the State House of Representatives in 1885 and 1886, a delegate and speaker at the Democratic National Convention in 1888, and a delegate at the Democratic National Convention in 1900. Pigott was elected as a Democrat to the Fifty-third Congress (March 4, 1893 – March 3, 1895). He was not reelected for a second term, and resumed the practice of law.

He died in New Haven, July 1, 1919, and was interred in the St. Lawrence Cemetery.

His brother-in-law, James T. Mullen, was the first Supreme Knight of the Order of the Knights of Columbus.

His nephew, William P. Cronan, served as the 19th Naval Governor of Guam.

References

Sources
 
 "James Protus Pigott". Obituary Record of Yale Graduates 1919-1920.  New Haven: Yale University. August, 1920.

1852 births
1919 deaths
Yale Law School alumni
Politicians from New Haven, Connecticut
Democratic Party members of the Connecticut House of Representatives
Democratic Party members of the United States House of Representatives from Connecticut
19th-century American politicians
Yale College alumni